Francis Russell, Marquess of Tavistock (27 September 1739 – 22 March 1767) was a British politician and the eldest son of the 4th Duke of Bedford and his second wife Lady Gertrude Leveson-Gower.

From 1759 to 1761, he sat in the Irish House of Commons as Whig Member of Parliament for Armagh Borough and then in the British House of Commons for Bedfordshire until 1767.

He was elected as a Bailiff to the board of the Bedford Level Corporation in 1761, a position he held until his death.

On 8 June 1764, he married Lady Elizabeth Keppel, the youngest child of the 2nd Earl of Albemarle. They had three sons:

Francis Russell, 5th Duke of Bedford (1765–1802)
John Russell, 6th Duke of Bedford (1766–1839)
Lord William Russell (1767–1840)

Lord Tavistock died in 1767 after falling from his horse while hunting. Their eldest son succeeded his grandfather as 5th Duke of Bedford in 1771.

References

1739 births
1767 deaths
British courtesy marquesses
British MPs 1761–1768
Heirs apparent who never acceded
Francis
Deaths by horse-riding accident
Irish MPs 1727–1760
Members of the Parliament of Great Britain for English constituencies
Members of the Parliament of Ireland (pre-1801) for County Armagh constituencies